The Sabah Progressive Party (abbreviated SAPP) is a multiracial political party based in Sabah, Malaysia. It was registered on 21 January 1994 by dissidents led by former Sabah Chief Minister Datuk Yong Teck Lee from United Sabah Party. Formerly a component party in the ruling Barisan Nasional coalition, SAPP officially withdrew from BN in September 2008 to become independent. As of 2010, SAPP has two representatives in the national legislature and two in the Sabah State Assembly. In 2016, the party together with Homeland Solidarity Party formed the United Sabah Alliance. It later joined the United Alliance together with STAR and PBS in 2018. The SAPP became the main component party of the GRS coalition, the successor of United Alliance that was established in 2020 and registered in 2022.

History

Withdrawal from Barisan Nasional 
The SAPP won two parliamentary seats in the general election held on 8 March 2008. After the 2008 election, there were calls by many Sabahan political parties for more autonomy from the Malaysian federal government.

SAPP President Yong Teck Lee announced on 18 June 2008 that the party would file a "no-confidence motion" in the Dewan Rakyat on 23 June against Prime Minister Abdullah Ahmad Badawi, calling on him to step down. The party, criticising what it described as insensitivity on the part of the government towards issues in Sabah, said that it was taking advantage of a unique "window of opportunity" for the sake of Sabah interests, including autonomy, return of Labuan and 20% of oil revenues. The majority of the Sabah population are generally content with the SAPP no-confidence vote against Prime Minister Abdullah who has been accused a number of wrongdoings including corruption and abuse of power. In retaliation for calling for a vote of no-confidence against Abdullah, the BN supreme council issued a show-cause letter to SAPP. A 30-day period was to give SAPP a chance to reply and defend itself before BN took any action against them.

On 17 September 2008, SAPP quit Barisan Nasional. Nevertheless, the decision came at a price as the party's deputy president, one of its vice-presidents, and its youth chief (who chose to remain within BN) all opposed the move and withdrew from the party. Some 2,000 members of the party similarly disagreed from the move and left the party, showing support for these dissident leaders.

Forming the United Sabah Alliance 
In 2016, the party formed a part of the United Sabah Alliance (USA).

Representatives

Dewan Undangan Negeri (State Legislative Assembly)

Malaysian State Assembly Representatives 

Sabah State Legislative Assembly

General election results

State election results

See also 
 Politics of Malaysia
 List of political parties in Malaysia

References

External links 
 

Political parties in Sabah
1994 establishments in Malaysia
Political parties established in 1994